Genetic Testing and Molecular Biomarkers is a monthly peer reviewed scientific journal published by Mary Ann Liebert, Inc. The editor-in-chief is Garth Ehrlichs. The journal covers genetic testing research along with associated ethical, legal, social, and economic issues. Related genetic testing coverage includes risk assessment, genetic counseling, carrier detection, novel instrumentation, and cytogenetics. It is the official journal of Genetic Alliance.

Abstracting and indexing
This journal is indexed and abstracted by the following services: 
PubMed/MEDLINE
Current Contents/Life Sciences
Current Contents/Clinical Medicine
Science Citation Index
Biotechnology Citation Index
Biological Abstracts
BIOSIS Previews
EMBASE/Excerpta Medica
EMBiology
Scopus
CAB Abstracts
Global Health

References

External links

Mary Ann Liebert academic journals
Genetics journals
Molecular and cellular biology journals